The Dzyga Art Center is an artistic association, including gallery, theater and concert facilities, in Lviv, Ukraine, that implements various ideas, projects and artistic actions. The wide range of activities launched at Dzyga includes: concerts, exhibitions, film screenings, photos, designs, texts, promos, and avant-garde revolutions.

Activities 
"Dzyga" supports, produces and promotes the development of various genres of modern art: art (painting, graphics, sculpture, installations, performances, happenings, iconography, land art, body art, photography), music (rock, electronic music, jazz, blues, folk, classical music) literature, theatre, cinema, multimedia, etc.

History 
The Dzyga Art Center was founded in June 1993 by members of the student brotherhood of Lviv (Markiyan Ivaschysyn, Andriy Rozhniatovsky, Yaroslav Ruschyshyn, Andrian Klisch) and famous Lviv artists (Serhiy Proskurnia, Vlodko Kaufman). The Dzyga Art Center was opened in the former monastery of the Dominican Order in March 1997. This place became the physical center of initiatives.

Partners 

 Gallery "Dzyga"
 Literary cafe "Kabinet"
 Magazine "Chetver"
 Galician cafe "Pid synioyu fliashkoyu"
 Art cafe "Pid kleposydroyu"
 "Jazz club.Lviv"

Main projects 

 Jazz folk festival "Flyugery Lvova"
 Jazz festival "Jazz Bez"
 Ethnofestival "Pidkamin'" 2007-2008
 "Tyzhden aktualnogo mystetstva"
 Ukrainian-Polish cultural exchange "L2"
 International arts festival "Fort.Missia"
 Literary internet museum "Zhyvi holosy"

In addition, Dzyga is a co-organizer of the International Publishers' Forum, which turned Lviv into the book capital of Ukraine.

The association has organized and conducted a large number of events, often involving leading artists of Ukraine. Poland, Austria, Slovakia, the Czech Republic, USA, Russia and Japan.

In the media space, Dzyga founded the first informal radio station in Ukraine, called "Radio Initsiatyva", from which such famous figures of Ukrainian journalism and public life as Roman Chaika, Mykhailo Barbara, Marta Bilska, Kostya Bondarenko, Taras Batenko, Yuriy Sharifov and others came out. Dzyga was also the founder of the oppositional newspaper "Lvivska Gazeta".

Other projects 
In its projects, in particular in the project "Ye" (1995), Dzyga has collaborated with many future "stars" and famous music groups, such as "Pikkardiyska Tertsiya", "Okean Elzy", "Plach Jeremyi", "Mertvy Piven", "Vohni Velykoho Mista", "Dzyga Jazz Quintet", "ShockolaD", Ruslana and others.

The most popular literary project of Dzyga was the magazine "Chetver", edited by the avant-garde Ukrainian writer Yuriy Izdryk.

A separate project was the club "Lialka", which is one of the cult places in artistic circles not only in Lviv, but throughout Ukraine. The club lasted from 1998 to 2008. The organization decided it was better to leave the myth of "Lialka" than to turn it into a boring conformist club or tourist attraction.

Gallery "Dzyga": ART-terra of contemporary art for artists who overcome the space bounded by four walls with their creations, filling it with paintings, graphics, sculpture, installations, performances, happenings, iconography, adding their soul, energy and charisma.

On the basis of the artistic association, some projects were singled out:

 a film club created for the development of cinematographic and artistic culture of Lviv residents and guests of the city.
 "B / W.5x5" - Our goal - to shed light on the world!

That is: the promotion of modern European photography in the minds of people whose lives are somehow connected with the art of light painting. Who is with us: a member of the photo club can be individual photographers, regardless of the level of skill and cost of the camera, and the photo group. Our task: to enlighten everyone who is able to see, cultivate taste, materialize beauty in photos, share true knowledge, self-improvement and improve the world.

Ethnoclub Nabutkiv is an ideological center, a spiritual center and an art school. It is a creative workshop that brings together musicians, researchers and fans of ethnic culture. For those who are interested in the mystery of ancient music - this is a journey in search of their own sound. For those who care about the authentic performance of folk music - the opportunity to acquire in their native circle. Traditional music is the source or core of our common search. And, guided by the revelations of ancient music, we are on the path of perfection and eternal harmony: we start good vibrations and listen to the resonance of the world.

"Jazz Club. Lviv " confirms the title of jazz city. The musical environment of the city was finally organized into the Jazz Club. Lviv "for the development and promotion of quality jazz, education and promotion of young performers, establishing mechanisms for jazz concerts and festivals, information exchange, communication with other cities and the emergence of Lviv jazz on the leading European stages. One of the most important areas of the club will be educational programs.

Statistics 
During its existence, the art association has organized more than a thousand events, some of which have become legends: non-traditional festivals "Vyvykh", festivals "Ukrainska Molod Chrestovi", "Novyi Noyev Kovcheh", "Sluchay Ukrainske!", music and literary project "Ye".

Summing up the results in the 15th anniversary in 2008, Dzyga received the following statistics: 394 exhibitions, 1,223 club concerts, 119 exclusive concert projects, 26 festivals, 117 performances, 360 literary presentations and many other extraordinary attractions, which gathered more than 1,5 million participants, visitors and spectators.

Administration 

 Markiyan Ivaschyshyn, director of the Dzyga Art Center  
 Volodymyr Kaufman, art director.

See also

Serhiy Proskurnia

References

External links 
 Official website

Museums established in 1993
Culture in Lviv
Contemporary art galleries in Ukraine